Romoli is a surname. Notable people with the surname include:

Emanuele Romoli (born 1957), Italian indoor rower
Ettore Romoli (1938–2018), Italian politician
Francesco Romoli (born 1977), Italian artist
Pedro Rómoli (born 1971), Argentine football player